The House of Potocki (plural: Potoccy, male: Potocki, feminine: Potocka) was a prominent Polish noble family in the Kingdom of Poland and magnates of the Polish–Lithuanian Commonwealth. The Potocki family is one of the wealthiest and most powerful aristocratic families in Poland.

History
The Potocki family originated from the small village of Potok Wielki; their family name derives from that place name. The family contributed to the cultural development and history of Poland's Eastern Borderlands (today Western Ukraine). The family is renowned for numerous Polish statesmen, military leaders, and cultural activists.

The first known Potocki was Żyrosław z Potoka (born about 1136). The children of his son Aleksander (~1167) castelan of Sandomierz, were progenitors of new noble families such as the Moskorzewskis, Stanisławskis, Tworowskis, Borowskis, and Stosłowskis. Jakub Potocki (c. 1481-1551) was the progenitor of the magnate line of the Potocki family.
   
The magnate line split into three primary lineages, called:
 "Linia hetmańska" ("Srebrna Pilawa"), in English: "Hetman's lineage" ("Silver Pilawa"). Note some sources refer to Pilawa as Piława.
 "Linia Prymasowa" ("Złota Pilawa"), in English: "Primate's lineage" ("Golden Pilawa")
 "Żelazna Pilawa", considered the oldest ones, in English: "Iron Pilawa"

The "Złota Pilawa" line received the title of count from the Emperor of the Holy Roman Empire in 1606. The entire family began using the Count title after the partitions of Poland. The title was recognized 1777 and 1784 in the Kingdom of Galicia and Lodomeria and 1838, 1843, 1859, 1890 1903 in Russia and 1889 by the Pope and in the Kingdom of Poland (Congress Poland). 

In 1631 Stefan Potocki, who started the "Złota Pilawa" lineage, died and was buried in Zolotyi Potik (pl. Złoty Potok, Golden Potok, a village owned by this lineage), his descendants started to use the Pilawa coat of arms in golden colour. Because of that the lineage is called the "Złota Pilawa" (Golden Piława).

There are also four branches called:

 "Gałąź łańcucka" (Branch of Łańcut)
 "Gałąź krzeszowicka" (Branch of Krzeszowice)
 "Gałąź tulczyńska" (Branch of Tulczyn)
 "Gałąź wilanowska" (branch of Wilanów)

Named after the hubs of their respective constellations of properties.

The family became prominent in the 16th and 17th centuries as a result of the patronage of Chancellor Jan Zamoyski and King Sigismund III Vasa.

Notable family members
 Aleksander Stanisław Potocki (1778–1845), landowner, politician
 Alfred Józef Potocki (1817–1889), Sejm Marshal, Minister-President of Austria
 Alfred Wojciech Potocki (1785–1862), landowner, politician
 Andrzej Potocki (1630-1692), Field Crown Hetman
 Andrzej Potocki (1618–1663), Obozny and voivode
 Antoni Protazy Potocki (1761–1801), banker and voivode
 Artur Potocki (1787–1832), landowner, officer
 Ewa Józefina Julia Potocka (1818–1895), married to Prince Franz de Paula of Liechtenstein
 Feliks Kazimierz Potocki (1630–1702), Field and Great Hetman of the Crown
 Franciszek Salezy Potocki (1700–1772), Krajczy, Field Clerk of the Crown
 Ignacy Potocki (1750–1809), politician, writer and office holder.
 Jan Potocki (1761–1815), writer (The Manuscript Found in Saragossa)
 Jerzy Józef Potocki (1889–1961), diplomat, officer
 Józef Potocki (1673–1751), Great Hetman of the Crown
 Józef Potocki (?-1723), Great Guard of the Crown
 Katarzyna Potocka (?-1642), was married to Janusz Radziwiłł
 Konstancja Potocka (1781–1852), was married to Jan Potocki and Edward Raczyński
 Mikołaj Potocki (1595–1651), Field and Great Crown Hetman
 Mikołaj Bazyli Potocki (1712–1782), Starost of Kaniv, benefactor of the Pochayiv Lavra
 Natalia Potocka (1810–1830), was married to Roman Sanguszko
 Roman Ignacy Potocki (1750–1809), co-author of the Polish Constitution of May 3, 1791
 Roman Potocki (1852–1915), landowner
 Seweryn Potocki (1762–1829), curator of Kharkov educational district in Russian Empire 
 Stanisław Kostka Potocki (1755–1821), writer, publicist, collector and patron of art
 Stanisław "Rewera" Potocki (1579–1667), Field and Great Hetman of the Crown
 Stanisław Potocki (1659–1683), starost of Halicz and Kołomyja, rotmistrz and pułkownik of cavalry
 Stanisław Szczęsny Potocki (1753–1805), Marshal of the Targowica Confederation.
 Stefan Potocki, voivode of Bratslav (1568-1631), starosta of Fellin
 Stefan Potocki (1624–1648), starosta of Nizhyn
 Stefan Aleksander Potocki (? — 1726/1727), the founder of the Basilian Buchach basilian monastery
 Teodor Potocki (1664–1738), Primate of Poland and interrex in 1733
 Wiktoria Elżbieta Potocka (died c. 1670), was married to Adam Hieronim Sieniawski and Andrzej Potocki

Other relatives
Count Geoffrey Potocki de Montalk (1902–1997), an accomplished New Zealand poet, has been erroneously described as a "feigned member" of the Pilawa Potocki family. In fact, he is a direct descendant of the Bocki Potocki line, until recently believed to have died out with the death of Count Jozef Franciszek Jan Potocki, his great-grandfather, in Paris.

Purported members
 Avraham ben Avraham, birth name Valentin Potocki. Purportedly converted to Judaism, moved to Vilna to hide his identity but was executed for heresy on May 23, 1749 (the second day of the Jewish holiday of Shavuot). His remains are believed to have been secretly buried next to the Vilna Gaon, with a monument to that effect first erected in 1927. Though his existence is generally accepted among Orthodox Jews, many secular scholars contest his existence due to a lack of primary sources. He was first mentioned in writing by Rabbi Yaakov Emden in 1755, six years after he would have died.
 Maria Patocka: said to be the mother of Crimean khan Adil Giray.

Coat of arms and motto
The Potocki family used the Piława coat of arms, and their motto was Scutum opponebat scuto (Latin for "Shield opposing shield"; literally "He opposed shield to shield").

See also
 Potocki Palace, several palaces associated with the Potocki family
 Pochayiv Lavra
 Piława Coat of Arms

Further reading
 Potocka-Wąsowiczowa, Anna z Tyszkiewiczów. Wspomnienia naocznego świadka. Warszawa: Państwowy Instytut Wydawniczy, 1965.

References

External links

Family album from about 1860-1875(Public Domain)